This is a list of all cricketers who have played first-class, list A or Twenty20 cricket for Baroda cricket team. Seasons given are first and last seasons; the player did not necessarily play in all the intervening seasons. Players in bold have played international cricket.

Last updated at the end of the 2015/16 season.

A
 Hemu Adhikari, 1937/38-1949/50
 Bharat Adiecha, 1988/89-1989/90
 Mohinder Amarnath, 1984/85
 Surinder Amarnath, 1983/84
 Srinivas Ambegaokar, 1937/38-1939/40
 Khagesh Amin, 1990/91-1992/93
 Ajitesh Argal, 2008/09-2015/16
 Rishi Arothe, 2013/14-2015/16
 Tushar Arothe, 1985/86-2003/04
 Hakumatrai Asha, 1944/45

B
 Imtiaz Babi, 1980/81
 Rajendra Babla, 1976/77-1978/79
 Hitshu Bachani, 2001/02-2002/03
 Bobby Badola, 1997/98-1998/99
 Dilip Bagwe, 1957/58
 Jairaj Barot, 1970/71-1978/79
 Atul Bedade, 1988/89-2002/03
 Gordon Belsher, 1994/95
 Firdaush Bhaja, 2009/10-2013/14
 Ashit Bhansali, 1982/83-1983/84
 Bhargav Bhatt, 2009/10-2015/16
 Raju Bhatt, 1961/62-1966/67
 Ajit Bhoite, 1996/97-2006/07
 Viraj Bhosale, 2016/17-present
 Vijay Bhosle, 1957/58-1958/59
 Azhar Bilakhia, 2007/08-2009/10
 M. V. Bobjee, 1941/42
 Chandu Borde, 1954/55-1962/63
 Ahmed Botawala, 1937/38
 Bhupinder Brar, 1996/97
 Valmik Buch, 1993/94-2003/04

C
 Paul Carey, 1942/43
 Rohit Chandurkar, 2002/03-2003/04
 Pratyush Chatterji, 2011/12
 Abhimanyu Chauhan, 2005/06-2015/16
 Indravijaysinh Chauhan, 1973/74-1975/76
 Arjun Chavada, 1996/97-1999/00
 Deepak Chavan, 1988/89-1990/91
 Kedar Chavan, 1986/87-1996/97
 Jyot Chhaya, 2010/11-2013/14
 Sanjeev Choksi, 1988/89-1991/92
 Prabhakar Cholkar, 1967/68-1976/77
 M. S. Chumble, 1949/50

D
 Jayant Dandekar, 1965/66
 Prayan Dave, 1993/94-1998/99
 Harkant Desai, 1938/39
 Himanshu Desai, 1963/64-1967/68
 Shantu Desai, 1938/39
 Ravi Deshmukh, 1973/74-1985/86
 Sharad Deshmukh, 1966/67
 Kedar Devdhar, 2007/08-2015/16
 Mrunal Devdhar, 2015/16
 Viresh Dhaiber, 1981/82
 Jagdevrao Dhumal, 1939/40
 Dinshaw Doctor, 1941/42
 Sunil Doshi, 1990/91-1993/94
 Shaukat Dudha, 1967/68-1980/81
 Shaukat Dukanwala, 1980/81-1990/91 (played international cricket for United Arab Emirates)

E
 Amir Elahi, 1943/44-1949/50 (played international cricket for India and Pakistan)

F
 Shrikant Fadnis, 1964/65-1970/71
 Tony Fernandes, 1962/63-1973/74
 Leslie Fernandes, 1966/67-1978/79

G
 Anshuman Gaekwad, 1969/70-1991/92
 Chandrasen Gaekwad, 1947/48-1952/53
 Datta Gaekwad, 1947/48-1963/64
 Maharaja of Baroda Fatehsinghrao Gaekwad, 1946/47-1957/58
 Ranjitsinh Gaekwad, 1958/59-1967/68
 Samarjeet Gaekwad, 1987/88-1988/89
 Sangramsinh Gaekwad, 1960/61-1975/76
 Shatrunjay Gaekwad, 2003/04-2013/14
 Vinaysinh Gaekwad, 1949/50-1957/58
 Khaderao Gaekwar, 1937/38-1942/43
 Edulji Gai, 1939/40-1941/42
 Chandrakant Gamit, 1972/73
 Ramesh Gandhi, 1972/73
 Vasantrao Ghatge, 1957/58-1961/62
 Pratik Ghodadra, 2014/15
 Jayasinghrao Ghorpade, 1948/49-1965/66
 Jayendrasinh Ghorpade, 1954/55-1976/77
 Wyankatrao Ghorpade, 1937/38-1943/44
 Anupam Gupta, 2009/10-2012/13
 A. G. Gupte, 1937/38-1939/40
 S. G. Gupte, 1943/44
 Vikas Gupte, 1973/74
 Prakash Gurubaxani, 2002/03

H
 Saiyed Hamid Ali, 1998/99-2007/08
 Kunal Hazare, 1997/98
 Ranjit Hazare, 1966/67-1983/84
 Sanjay Hazare, 1981/82-1997/98
 Vijay Hazare, 1941/42-1960/61
 Vikram Hazare, 1970/71-1978/79
 Vivek Hazare, 1942/43-1963/64
 Deepak Hooda, 2012/13-2015/16

I
 Hemant Indulkar, 1995/96-1999/00
 Mahipatrao Indulkar, 1940/41-1943/44
 Vijay Indulkar, 1961/62-1965/66

J
 Himanshu Jadhav, 1992/93-2006/07
 Mahesh Jadhav, 1964/65-1966/67
 Madavsinh Jagdale, 1939/40
 Chandrasekhar Joshi, 1951/52-1955/56
 Shekhar Joshi, 2000/01-2006/07
 Vimal Joshi, 2003/04-2004/05
 Shashank Junnarkar, 1992/93

K
 Chandrakant Kadam, 1959/60
 Muenoddin Kadri, 1996/97-1999/00
 Harish Kahar, 1981/82-1989/90
 Santosh Kahar, 1988/89
 Sudeep Kale, 2001/02
 Abhijit Karambelkar, 2008/09-2015/16
 Kamraj Kesari, 1941/42
 Suresh Keshwala, 1984/85
 Ashok Khaire, 1969/70
 A. G. Khan, 1937/38
 Zaheer Khan, 1999/00-2005/06
 Gogumal Kishenchand, 1952/53-1969/70
 Jaykishan Kolsawala, 2010/11
 Sudhir Kulkarni, 1973/74-1982/83
 Vinod Kunjaravia, 1980/81-1981/82

L
 Anil Limaye, 1963/64-1967/68
 Madhav Limaye, 1953/54-1960/61

M
 Dharmsinh Mahida, 1965/66-1968/69
 Vinoo Majithia, 1963/64
 Sagar Mangalorkar, 2014/15-2015/16
 Ilyas Manjare, 1972/73
 Jagdeep Mankad, 1971/72
 Jacob Martin, 1991/92-2009/10
 Dishant Mehta, 2006/07
 Raju Mehta, 1977/78-1979/80
 Lukman Meriwala, 2012/13-2014/15
 Milip Mewada, 1996/97-2004/05
 Dhiren Mistry, 2012/13-2014/15
 Gul Mohammad, 1943/44-1950/51 (played international cricket for India and Pakistan)
 Aditya Mohite, 1997/98
 Chandrasekhar Mohite, 1972/73-1981/82
 Harshad Mohite, 1998/99
 Nikunj Mohite, 2006/07-2008/09
 Nayan Mongia, 1988/89-2004/05
 B. B. More, 1937/38
 Kiran More, 1980/81-1997/98
 Pradeep More, 1969/70
 Darshan Mulherkar, 1997/98-2000/01

N
 Mutyalswami Naidu, 1939/40-1947/48
 Jasmin Naik, 1986/87-1988/89
 Rajiv Naik, 1990/91-1995/96
 Mukesh Narula, 1985/86-1996/97
 Nazeem Nathani, 1972/73-1973/74
 C. S. Nayudu, 1939/40-1943/44
 B. B. Nimbalkar, 1939/40
 R. B. Nimbalkar, 1937/38-1952/53

P
 Abhay Palkar, 1987/88-1992/93
 Ketan Panchal, 2005/06-2015/16
 Bipin Panchasara, 1979/80-1984/85
 Vinayak Pandit, 1939/40-1943/44
 Hardik Pandya, 2012/13-2015/16
 Hemant Pandya, 1983/84-1984/85
 Krunal Pandya, 2012/13-2014/15
 Rishikesh Parab, 2001/02-2006/07
 Siddharth Parab, 1997/98
 Satyajit Parab, 1997/98-2009/10
 Madhav Paranjpe, 1943/44
 Vasudev Paranjpe, 1956/57
 Dashrat Pardeshi, 1978/79-1990/91
 Rakesh Parikh, 1983/84-1995/96
 Snehal Parikh, 1981/82-1985/86
 Chandrabhan Parmar, 1937/38
 Hardik Parmar, 2001/02-2009/10
 Kishansinh Parmar, 1956/57-1958/59
 Madansinh Parmar, 1956/57-1959/60
 Vishwanath Parmar, 2005/06-2013/14
 Ahmed Patel, 1940/41-1951/52
 Alpesh Patel, 2006/07
 Atul Patel, 1966/67-1968/69
 Chimanbhai Patel, 1952/53-1966/67
 Dixit Patel, 2014/15-2015/16
 Girishbhai Patel, 1975/76-1976/77
 Jayantibhai Patel, 1953/54-1954/55
 Jitendra Patel, 1964/65-1965/66 (played international cricket for Canada)
 Ketul Patel, 2012/13-2013/14
 Lalubhai Patel, 1973/74
 Mahesh Patel, 1969/70-1970/71
 Mayur Patel, 1980/81-1987/88
 Monil Patel, 2011/12
 Munaf Patel, 2008/09-2015/16
 Pragnesh Patel, 2004/05-2007/08
 Rakesh Patel, 1999/00-2010/11
 Ramchandra Patel, 1954/55-1961/62
 Rashid Patel, 1986/87-1996/97
 Rohit Patel, 1967/68-1974/75
 Sanjay Patel, 1991/92-1996/97
 Umang Patel, 2000/01-2002/03
 Upendra Patel, 1964/65
 Utkarsh Patel, 2008/09-2013/14
 Vasudev Patel, 1979/80-1985/86
 Babashafi Pathan, 2013/14
 Irfan Pathan, 2000/01-2015/16
 Irfan Pathan, 1999/00-2008/09
 Yusuf Pathan, 2001/02-2015/16
 Sharad Patkar, 1949/50
 Sangramsinh Pawar, 1992/93
 Rajesh Pawar, 2003/04-2009/10
 Amar Petiwale, 1981/82-1989/90
 Kiran Powar, 2004/05-2006/07
 Rambhau Powar, 1938/39-1942/43
 Shankarrao Powar, 1937/38-1950/51
 Rajaram Pradhan, 1938/39
 Ramesh Pradhan, 1945/46-1951/52

R
 Vasant Raiji, 1944/45-1949/50
 Tilak Raj, 1984/85-1987/88
 Ambati Rayudu, 2010/11-2015/16
 Adityananda Reddy, 2008/09-2012/13
 Suresh Ringe, 1974/75-1976/77

S
 Hazaratali Saiyad, 1959/60-1968/69
 Dhiran Salvi, 2002/03-2005/06
 Rohan Salvi, 2001/02
 Dinkar Sankpal, 1969/70-1972/73
 Narayan Satham, 1967/68-1984/85
 Nanashed Savant, 1960/61-1961/62
 Sanjiv Sawant, 1985/86-1990/91
 Miten Shah, 2010/11
 Pinal Shah, 2004/05-2015/16
 Kamran Shaikh, 2008/09-2013/14
 Mehndi Shaikh, 1968/69-1980/81
 Anwar Sheikh, 1992/93
 Kedar Sheikh, 1949/50
 Yacoob Sheikh, 1937/38-1950/51
 Zubeer Sheikh, 2006/07
 Atit Sheth, 2014/15-2015/16
 Sadu Shinde, 1947/48-1948/49
 Deepak Shodhan, 1957/58-1959/60
 Irshad Sindhi, 2005/06-2010/11
 Gagandeep Singh, 2010/11-2015/16
 Sukhbir Singh, 1993/94-2002/03
 Sunit Singh, 2005/06-2012/13
 Swapnil Singh, 2005/06-2015/16
 Laxman Sivaramakrishnan, 1998/99
 Ranga Sohoni, 1948/49
 Hitesh Solanki, 2015/16
 Rakesh Solanki, 2002/03-2013/14
 Shailesh Solanki, 2006/07-2009/10
 Vishnu Solanki, 2012/13-2014/15
 Ashok Sonalkar, 1964/65-1969/70
 Dinesh Soni, 1992/93
 Sukhdevsinhji, 1953/54
 R. A. Swaroop, 1995/96-2000/01

T
 Soaeb Tai, 2015/16
 Arun Tambe, 1957/58
 Ashish Tandon, 1995/96-1998/99
 Uday Tate, 1967/68-1968/69
 D. Thorat, 2000/01

V
 Murtuja Vahora, 2005/06-2015/16
 Salim Veragi, 2007/08-2012/13
 Shyamrao Vichare, 1943/44-1960/61
 Jyotirvadan Vin, 1953/54-1963/64
 Trivikram Vinod, 1940/41-1943/44
 Sankalp Vora, 2004/05-2012/13
 Vijay Vyas, 1983/84

W
 Vinit Wadkar, 1978/79-1988/89
 Aditya Waghmode, 2010/11-2015/16
 Saurabh Wakaskar, 2011/12-2014/15
 Yogendra Wakaskar, 1997/98-2000/01
 Cecil Williams, 1961/62-1977/78
 Connor Williams, 1995/96-2010/11

Y
 D. K. Yarde, 1937/38
 J. J. Yelwande, 1937/38-1938/39

Z
 Ikram Zampawala, 2008/09
 Indravadan Zaveri, 1951/52-1952/53

References

Baroda cricketers